Georges de Selve (1508 – 12 April 1541) was a French scholar, diplomat and ecclesiastic.

Biography
He was the son of Jean de Selve, a jurist and Parlement president, and brother of Odet de Selve. Three other brothers served as diplomats.

Georges de Selve was Bishop of Lavaur from 1526 (at age 18) to 1540. He was sent by King Francis I of France  as ambassador to the Republic of Venice, Austria (in April 1540), to the Pope in Rome, to England, Germany and Spain.

He is the figure of the right in a picture by Hans Holbein the Younger, The Ambassadors, and Jean de Dinteville is the other one, which hangs in the National Gallery, London. De Selve was just 25 when Holbein painted him and he is wearing the vestments of a clergyman, who represent the interests of the Catholic Church, since he had just been appointed Bishop of Lavaur in France.

He wrote on theology, studied with and was a patron of Eli Levita from 1534, and was commissioned by the king to make translations.

He died on 12 February 1541 at the age of 33 and is interred at Lavaur Cathedral.

Bibliography
Robert J. Kalas, The Selve Family of Limousin: Members of a New Elite in Early Modern France, The Sixteenth Century Journal, 18 (1987), 147-172

References

1508 births
1541 deaths
16th-century French diplomats
16th-century French Roman Catholic bishops
Bishops of Lavaur
Ambassadors of France to the Republic of Venice
Ambassadors of France to Austria
Ambassadors of France to England